Ancistrocarphus filagineus is a North American species of flowering plants in the family Asteraceae, known by the common names woolly fishhooks and hooked groundstar. It is native to western North America, including Idaho, Oregon, Nevada, California, and Baja California.

Ancistrocarphus filagineus grows in many types of habitat, including bare, rocky habitat with clay or serpentine soils and recently burned areas. It is a petite annual herb rarely more than 15 cm (6 inches) tall. It has gray, woolly-haired herbage. The linear, lance-shaped, or oval leaves are up to 3 centimeters long and are alternately arranged on the short stems. The inflorescence is a cluster of a few small star-shaped flower heads a few millimeters wide.

References

External links
United States Department of Agriculture Plants Profile
Calphotos Photo gallery, University of California photos
Natural History of Orange County, California, University of California, Irvine, Woolly Fishhooks (False Neststraw), Ancistrocarphus filagineus photos

Gnaphalieae
Flora of the Western United States
Flora of Baja California
Plants described in 1868